Bulwer Island Refinery was an oil refinery on Bulwer Island near the mouth of the Brisbane River in Queensland, Australia. It is now a petroleum import and storage terminal. It was built by Amoco in the 1960s, taken over by BP in 1984 and converted to an import terminal in 2015. It occupies much of the former island. While it operated, it was the largest oil refinery in Queensland.

History
Land reclamation and refinery construction took place during 1963–1965, with the reclamation greatly expanding the original island and joining it to the north bank of the river. When it was constructed, it had a maximum capacity of 25,000 barrels per day, but operated at around 10,000 barrels per day to match Queensland demand at the time. It was built by Amoco and was almost directly across the Brisbane River from Ampol's Lytton Oil Refinery which was built at around the same time.

BP bought the refinery from Amoco in 1984. Before and after this acquisition, expansion had increased daily capacity to 80,000 barrels per day by 1996. A further upgrade increased this to over 85,000 barrels per day in 2000, and 102,000 barrels per day by 2014.

On 2 April 2014, BP announced that this refinery would be closed mid-2015, its jetty and terminal will remain operational. The decision was made due to increasing Asian competition and a strong Australian dollar.

References

Oil refineries in Australia
Industrial buildings in Queensland
1965 establishments in Australia
Industrial buildings completed in 1965
2015 disestablishments in Australia
Pinkenba, Queensland